Zhu Youyuan (22 July 1476 – 13 July 1519), was a prince of the Ming dynasty of China. He was the fourth son of the Chenghua Emperor.

Created Prince of Xing (興王), his fief was near today's Zhongxiang, in Hubei Province. He and his wife were posthumously honored by his son after he became the Jiajing Emperor in 1521.

Aftermath

Burial place
His tomb originally was an ordinary prince's tomb which located at Songlin Mount (松林山), Zhongxiang, Hubei Province. The tomb was rebuilt in 1519, until 1521. His son the Jiajing Emperor enthroned, Jiajing against the ministers for his posthumously title. Later, he was posthumously honored as "Emperor Xingxian" (興獻帝), then his tomb rebuilt as emperor's style and renamed as "Xianling" (顯陵).

Worship imperial ancestral temple
Originally, ministers against the Jiajing Emperor for worship imperial temple for Zhu Youyuan. Then, Jiajing had to set up another temple for him and named as "shimiao" (世廟), then renamed as "Temple of Emperor Xian" in 1536. Two years later, the temple restyled as imperial ancestral temple, and Jiajing honored Zhu Youyuan with the temple name "Ruizong". At that time, Jiajing had relocated the temple with the Hongzhi Emperor's temple, because they were brothers.

After the temple was rebuilt, Jiajing had veto for let Zhu Youyuan shared the sam temple with Hongzhi, and relocated the temple at the above of the Zhengde Emperor's temple. At this point, Jiajing had finally posthumously honored Zhu Youyuan as emperor and finished the worship.

During the reigns of the Wanli and Tianqi emperors, ministers had requested to remove Zhu Youyuan's temple, but still got veto.

Zhu Youyuan's imperial made epitaph of Prince Xian of Xing
The original text:

Approximately translate:

Family
Consorts and Issue:
 Empress Cixiaoxian, of the Jiang clan (d. 1538)
 Zhu Houxi, Prince Huai of Yue (7 July 1500 – 12 July 1500), first son
 Princess Changning (26 November 1501 – 16 April 1504), first daughter
 Princess Yongfu (20 May 1506 – 20 June 1525), third daughter
 Married Wu Jinghe (1508–1568) in 1523
 Zhu Houcong, the Jiajing Emperor (16 September 1507 – 23 January 1567), second son
 Princess Yongchun (2 October 1511 – 1540), fourth daughter
 Married Xie Zhao (1512–1567) in 1527, and had issue (one son)
 Consort Wenjingshu, of the Wang clan (d. 1532)
 Princess Shanhua (21 July 1503 – 15 May 1512), second daughter

Ancestry

References

1476 births
1519 deaths
Ming dynasty imperial princes
Ming dynasty posthumous emperors
Sons of emperors